The University of South Florida Sarasota–Manatee (also known as USFSM or USF Sarasota-Manatee) is a branch campus of the University of South Florida in Sarasota, Florida. USFSM was established in 1975 as a regional campus of the University of South Florida and gained separate accreditation by the Southern Association of Colleges and Schools Commission on Colleges to award baccalaureate and master's degrees in June 2011. It was consolidated with the other two USF campuses (Tampa and St. Petersburg) as of July 1, 2020.

USFSM offers more than 40 bachelor's degrees, master's degrees, and certificate programs in four colleges: Liberal Arts and Social Sciences, Science and Math, Business, and Hospitality and Tourism Leadership. Day, evening, weekend and online classes serve more than 4,500 students annually.

History
USFSM opened in 1975 as a satellite campus of the University of South Florida.

Initial tie with New College
After its creation in 1975, the University of South Florida Sarasota–Manatee shared the original campus of New College of Florida, which it adopted as its honors college for more than two decades. New College and USF Sarasota-Manatee continued to share campuses until a new campus was built for USF Sarasota-Manatee and New College returned to being a separate institution.

Move to a new solo campus
A new campus for USFSM opened on August 28, 2006. The campus was built on the eastern portion of Dunham-Crosley-Horton property (Seagate), a historic home that was listed on the National Register of Historic Places in 1983. After a campaign by Friends of Seagate for public acquisition this property had been brought into public ownership in 1991 by the state for the use of the sixteen bay front acres by Manatee County as a historical site and the remainder for research use by the environmental studies department of New College. Potential development purposes were remote at the time.

When New College and the university separated, however, the upland pine forest on the eastern portion of this property was allocated for the development of a new campus for the university. University students and community leaders participated on the team that created the design of the new facilities in a protracted charrette.

The college campus is a  facility with twenty-four classrooms, a 190-seat lecture and exhibition hall, seminar and video-conferencing rooms, computer laboratories, student gathering places, faculty and staff offices, a technology and learning center, a library commons and dining facilities.

In 2010 the campus became the home of a new facility for the radio and television networks of the university, WUSF (FM), WSMR (FM), and WUSF-TV that are part of the public broadcasting network.

Chancellors

References

External links

Buildings and structures in Sarasota, Florida
Education in Manatee County, Florida
University of South Florida
Educational institutions established in 1975
Education in Pinellas County, Florida
Education in Sarasota County, Florida
Satellite campuses
1975 establishments in Florida